Riedelia is a genus of plants in the family Zingiberaceae. The genus contains approximately 75 species that are distributed among New Guinea, the Solomon Islands, and Maluku Province in eastern Indonesia. Among the described species is Riedelia charontis, which was formally described in 2010.

References

Alpinioideae
Zingiberaceae genera
Taxa named by Daniel Oliver